Mikhail Ryazanov is a professional ice hockey player who currently plays the 2010–11 season in the Kontinental Hockey League with Metallurg Novokuznetsk.

References

Living people
Metallurg Novokuznetsk players
Year of birth missing (living people)
Russian ice hockey defencemen